The Boston College Center for Work and Family (CWF) was founded in 1990 at the Boston University School of Social Work by professor Bradley Googins. Today, the center is part of the Carroll School of Management and Boston College.  The Center for Work & Family is a university-based research center focused on bridging academic research and corporate practice to help employers to improve the lives of working people and their families. The Center focuses its work primarily on the private sector and currently has more than 100 corporate members including many Fortune 500 companies.

Leadership
Brad Harrington is the Executive Director of the Boston College Center for Work & Family (CWF) and an associate research professor in the Carroll School of Management. Prior to his arrival at Boston College, Harrington was an executive with Hewlett-Packard Company for twenty years. Harrington's teaching and research focuses on career management and work-life integration, mobilizing and leading organizational change, and contemporary workforce management strategies. In the past two years, Harrington and his colleagues at the Center have focused much of their work on studying the career and work-life challenges of working fathers and this research has garnered significant international media attention. Along with noted career scholar Professor Douglas T. Hall of Boston University, he is the author of Career Management and Work/Life Integration: Using Self-Assessment to Navigate Contemporary Careers (SAGE Publications, 2007).

Research

The Boston College Center for Work & Family conducts research on a wide variety of topics related to work-life, workplace flexibility, men and fatherhood, women’s advancement, diversity and inclusion, global workforce issues, and employee health and wellness efforts.

Corporate partnerships

The Center maintains three corporate partnership initiatives, the Boston College Roundtable, the Global Workforce Roundtable and the New England Work & Family Association.  Nearly 100 large employers currently collaborate with the Center.

See also
 Work–life balance in the United States

References

External links
 

Boston College
1990 establishments in Massachusetts